Tattoo is the first Japanese extended play by South Korean boy group The Boyz. It was released on November 6, 2019 through Ariola Japan. The EP consists of six tracks.

Background 
On November 6, the Boyz officially debuted in Japan with the release of their first Japanese extended play Tattoo and its lead single with the same name.

Track listing

Charts

Release history

References 

2019 EPs
The Boyz (South Korean band) EPs